Ray Baxendale is a New Zealand former rugby league footballer who represented New Zealand in the 1975 and 1977 World Cups.

Playing career
Baxendale began his career playing for Runanga. A Junior Kiwi, Baxendale first made the New Zealand national rugby league team in 1975 at the World Cup and went on to play in 39 matches for New Zealand, including in 17 Test matches. Baxendale also represented the West Coast and the South Island.

In 1981 Baxendale joined Marist-Western Suburbs in the Canterbury Rugby League competition and represented Canterbury, captained the South Island against France and again played for New Zealand. He played for Wakefield Trinity (Heritage № 889) in the 1981-82 season.

References

Canterbury rugby league team players
Living people
Marist-Western Suburbs players
New Zealand national rugby league team players
New Zealand rugby league players
Expatriate sportspeople in England
Rugby league locks
Rugby league props
Rugby league second-rows
Runanga players
South Island rugby league team players
Wakefield Trinity players
West Coast rugby league team players
Junior Kiwis players
Year of birth missing (living people)